This is a list of the NCAA outdoor champions in the short sprint event.  Generally that was the 100-yard dash until 1975, with the metric 100 meters being contested in Olympic years starting in 1932.  Metrication occurred in 1976, so all subsequent championships were at the metric distance.  Hand timing was used until 1973, starting in 1974 fully automatic timing was used.

Champions
Key
y=yards
w=wind aided
A=Altitude assisted

References

GBR Athletics

External links
NCAA Division I men's outdoor track and field

NCAA Men's Division I Outdoor Track and Field Championships
Outdoor track, men
100 m